Dubrovnik is a city in Croatia.

Dubrovnik may also refer to:

 MF Dubrovnik (built 1979), a ferry operated by the Croatian shipping company Jadrolinija
 Yugoslav destroyer Dubrovnik, a destroyer built in 1931 for the Royal Yugoslav Navy
 KK Dubrovnik, basketball club from Dubrovnik
 Dubrovnik chess set, a chess set
 Dubrovnik (literary almanac), published in Dubrovnik 1849–1850, and Zagreb in 1851, and as an annual collection in 1867, 1868, 1870 and 1876
 Dubrovnik (literary magazine), published by the Dubrovnik branch of the Matica hrvatska, since 1955 occasionally and from 1964 quarterly
 Medieval Town of Dubrovnik, Bosnia, a medieval fortress in Bosnia and Herzegovina

See also
 Dobrovnik